"" is the 2nd single by Zard and released 25 June 1991 under B-Gram Records label. The single debuted at #30 rank first week. It charted for 5 weeks and sold over 31,000 copies.

Track list
All songs are written by Izumi Sakai and arranged by Masao Akashi

composer: Tetsurō Oda

composer: Izumi Sakai
for first time Izumi Sakai composed song on her own
in 2009, it was released as 45th single with collaborated chorus by Mai Kuraki

References

1991 singles
Zard songs
Songs written by Izumi Sakai
Songs written by Tetsurō Oda
1991 songs
Song recordings produced by Daiko Nagato